was a Japanese musician, composer, and record producer.

Life 
After performing first in so-called utagoe coffeehouses, he joined the band Hachimitsu Pie, and when they disbanded, he joined the Moonriders. Together with his Moonrider bandmates Ryōmei Shirai and Hirobumi Suzuki he started a unit called Artport.

In the 1980s, he composed many songs and produced albums for idols, especially for Yukiko Okada.

He died on December 17, 2013 from esophageal cancer.

Works (selection)

Albums 
 Rira no hoteru（1983）
 Kanojo no toki（1985）
 fin meguriai（1993）
 Kashibuchi Tetsuro SONGBOOK（1998）
 Kyo wa ame no hi desu（2002）
 Live Egocentrique（2003）
 Tsukuribanashi（2004）
 Jiyu na merodi - Hachimitsu Pie〜Moonriders（2009）
 LE GRAND（2009）

Producer, composer  for
 Agnes Chan
 Seri Ishikawa
 Rie Nakahara
 Eve
 Yukiko Okada
 Megumi Ōishi
 Akiko Ikuina

Soundtracks

Movies 
 Koisuru Onnatachi（1986）
  Tsuribaka Nisshi 5（1992）
 Tsuribaka Nisshi 6（1993）
 Tsuribaka Nisshi 7（1994）
 Tsuribaka Nisshi 8（1996）
 Tsuribaka Nisshi 9（1997）
 Tsuribaka Nisshi 10（1998）

Anime 
 Mobile Suit Gundam 0080: War in the Pocket（1989）
 Compiler（1992）

TV commercials 
 Nomura Securities（2005）
 Sekisui House（2007）
 Panasonic（2008）

Books 
 Rock drum ga tatakechatta（2006）

References

External links
  Tetsuro Kashibuchi at Discogs

1950 births
2013 deaths
20th-century drummers
20th-century Japanese composers
21st-century drummers
21st-century Japanese composers
Japanese male composers
Japanese record producers
Japanese rock drummers
Musicians from Tochigi Prefecture
20th-century Japanese male singers
20th-century Japanese singers
21st-century Japanese male singers
21st-century Japanese singers